Alastair Eric Hotson Salvesen  (born 1941) is a British billionaire businessman and heir.

Early life
Alastair Eric Hotson Salvesen was born in 1941, the son of Marion Hamilton (née McClure, died 1997) and Iver Ronald Stuart Salvesen (1901–1957). They owned Bonnington House from 1944 to 1978. Iver Salvesen was the grandson of the Norwegian, Christian Fredrik Salvesen (1827–1911), who, in 1846, founded the Christian Salvesen whaling and shipping company, whose first venture was sponsoring a ship to catch herring.

He was educated at Fettes College, and Cranfield University where he obtained an MBA. He is a chartered accountant. His first job was at a towel and bedding maker in Montreal, Canada.

Career
He is chairman of Dawnfresh Seafoods Ltd, Dawnfresh Holdings Ltd, Scot Trout Ltd, RR Spink and Sons Ltd, Dovecot Studios Ltd, The Dovecot Foundation, Praha Investment Holdings Ltd, Edinburgh New Town Cookery School Ltd, Fettes Enterprises Ltd 1995, and has various other business interests.

In April 2015, the Sunday Times estimated his net worth at £1.0 billion   In 2020, Salvesen received £214,363 from the Common Agricultural Policy, which included £64,425 for Greening Practices including a Grey Partridge conservation project on the Whitburgh Farm Estate.

Salvesen was chairman of the early-stage technology and science investor group Archangels from 2009 until he stepped down in March 2019.

Philanthropy
He donated £5 million to found The Salvesen Mindroom Centre at the University of Edinburgh. The Centre supports children and adults with learning difficulties.

Honours
He was appointed a CBE in 2011 for services to the arts and charity in Scotland.

Personal life
He is married to Elizabeth, and they have a daughter Venetia and a son George.

In 1992, they bought the Whitburgh estate near Pathhead, Midlothian.

References

1941 births
Living people
Scottish billionaires
British billionaires
Commanders of the Order of the British Empire
People educated at Fettes College
Place of birth missing (living people)
British accountants
Alumni of Cranfield University
Scottish people of Norwegian descent